Rajgad (literal meaning Ruling Fort) is a Hill region fort situated in the Pune district of Maharashtra, India. Formerly known as Murumbdev, the fort was the first capital of the Maratha Empire under the rule of Chhatrapati Shivaji for almost 26 years, after which the capital was moved to the Raigad Fort. Treasures discovered from an adjacent fort called Torna were used to completely build and fortify the Rajgad Fort.

The fort's ruins consist of palaces, water cisterns, and caves. This fort was built on a hill called Murumbadevi Dongar (Mountain of the Goddess Murumba). Rajgad boasts of the highest number of days stayed by Shivaji on any fort.

History

The fort has stood witness to many significant historic events including the birth of Chhatrapati Shivaji's son Rajaram I, the death of Chhatrapati Shivaji's  wife Saibai, the return of Shivaji from Agra, the burial of Afzal Khan's head in the Mahadarwaja walls of Balle Killa, the strict words of Sonopant Dabir to Shivaji.

The Rajgad Fort was also one of the 12 forts that Shivaji kept when he signed the Treaty of Purandar in 1665, with the Mughal general Jai Singh I, leader of the Mughal forces. Under this treaty, 23 forts were handed over to the Mughals.

List of chronological events

Tourism
The fort is a significant tourist destination and is most sought after especially during monsoon. Visitors prefer to stay overnight on the fort considering the fort itself is huge and cannot be explored in a single day. The Padmavati temple on the fort can accommodate around 50 people. Water tanks provide fresh water all throughout the year. Villagers from the foothills of Rajgad sell local antiques and items to these tourists.

Gallery

See also

List of forts in Maharashtra

References

External links

 Amazing Maharashtra
 Rajgad Fort Information in Marathi
 Pune Trekkers

Forts in Pune district
Former capital cities in India